Lü Boshe was an acquaintance of Cao Cao, a prominent warlord who rose to power towards the end of the Eastern Han dynasty and established the foundation of the state of Cao Wei in the Three Kingdoms period of China. According to historical sources, Cao Cao killed Lü Boshe's family in 189 or 190 when he passed by Lü's house on his way home to Chenliu (陳留; around present-day Kaifeng, Henan) after escaping from the imperial capital, Luoyang. Cao Cao's motive behind the murders remains ambiguous. One source claimed that he killed Lü Boshe's family in self-defence while two other texts stated that he suspected that Lü's family were plotting to harm him so he killed them preemptively. This event was dramatised in the 14th-century historical novel Romance of the Three Kingdoms, in which Lü Boshe himself also died at the hands of Cao Cao.

In historical records
There are three accounts of the murders of Lü Boshe's family.

The Wei Shu (魏書) recorded: 

The Shiyu (世語) recorded: 

The Zaji (雜記) recorded:

In Romance of the Three Kingdoms
The incident was dramatised in Chapter 4 of the 14th-century historical novel Romance of the Three Kingdoms.

In the novel, Lü Boshe is a sworn brother of Cao Cao's father, Cao Song, so Cao Cao regards him as an uncle. Cao Cao and Chen Gong pass by Lü Boshe's house while they are on their way to Cao Cao's home after Cao Cao escaped from Luoyang following his failed attempt on Dong Zhuo's life. Lü Boshe gives them a warm reception and instructs his family and servants to treat the guests well while he travels to town to purchase more items for a feast. During their stay in Lü Boshe's house, Cao Cao overhears the sharpening of knives and a conversation among Lü Boshe's servants about whether to "kill or to tie up first". He suspects that Lü Boshe is pretending to be hospitable towards him while actually plotting to harm him. He and Chen Gong dash out and indiscriminately kill everyone in Lü Boshe's household. Later, they discover that the servants were actually talking about slaughtering a pig for the feast and that they had killed innocent people. As it is too late for regrets, Cao Cao and Chen Gong immediately pack their belongings and leave the house. Along the way, they meet Lü Boshe, who is returning from his errand. When Lü Boshe asks them to stay, Cao Cao asks him: "Who is that behind you?" When Lü Boshe turns around, Cao Cao stabs him from behind and kills him. A shocked Chen Gong asks Cao Cao: "Just now, you made a genuine mistake when you killed those people. But what about now?". Cao Cao replies: "If Lü Boshe goes home and sees his family members all dead, do you think he will let us off? If he brings soldiers to pursue us, we will be in deep trouble." Chen Gong says: "It is a grave sin to kill someone with the intention of doing so." Cao Cao remarks: "I'd rather do wrong to the world than allow the world to do wrong to me." (寧教我負天下人，休教天下人負我) Chen Gong does not respond and he leaves Cao Cao that night.

Analysis
Luo Guanzhong, who wrote the 14th-century historical novel Romance of the Three Kingdoms, distorted the exact words Cao Cao said after he killed Lü Boshe's family. The most significant change is the replacing of "others" (人; literally "people") with "world" (天下人; literally "people under Heaven"). Yi Zhongtian, a Xiamen University history professor, speculated that Cao Cao was probably trying to console himself after mistakenly killing Lü Boshe's family by speaking in a regretful tone ("heartrendingly remarked"). Yi believed that Luo Guanzhong had deliberately changed the words in the quote to reflect that Cao Cao had no sense of remorse because "world" carries greater weight than "others", so as to enhance Cao's image as a villain in his novel.

See also
 Lists of people of the Three Kingdoms

References

 Chen, Shou (3rd century). Records of the Three Kingdoms (Sanguozhi).
 Luo, Guanzhong (14th century). Romance of the Three Kingdoms (Sanguo Yanyi).
 Pei, Songzhi (5th century). Annotations to Records of the Three Kingdoms (Sanguozhi zhu).
 

Han dynasty warlords